Henry Alberto Maradiaga Galeano (born 5 February 1990) is a Nicaraguan footballer who plays as a goalkeeper for Juventus Managua and the Nicaragua national team.

References

External links
 

1990 births
Living people
Nicaraguan men's footballers
People from Nueva Segovia Department
Association football goalkeepers
Nicaragua international footballers
Deportivo Ocotal players
UNAN Managua players
Real Estelí F.C. players
Juventus Managua players
2011 Copa Centroamericana players
2017 CONCACAF Gold Cup players
2019 CONCACAF Gold Cup players